Moigne, Le Moigne, Lemoigne or Le Moing may refer to:

Moigne derives from mogn which means armless in Breton or from the Old French moignier which means to mutilate.

Thomas Moigne
Jean-Louis Le Moigne
Shipton Moigne
Jérôme Lemoigne

Breton-language surnames